Blue Murder is a single British television crime drama film, written by Nick Collins, that first broadcast on ITV on 23 February 2000. The film follows Gale (Jemma Redgrave), a woman who plans to murder her husband with the help of her lover, Adam (Gary Mavers), who is also a police officer. The film was directed by Paul Unwin and drew 7.32 million viewers on its original broadcast.

Actress Jemma Redgrave said of the role; "Gale is completely cold-hearted and calculating, which was an irresistible challenge after playing someone was intensely warm as Eleanor in Bramwell. I really liked the contrast, plus the fact that Gale was so open to interpretation. She's a real chameleon. Just as you think you’re working her out, she changes again." The film was released on VHS on 22 May 2000. This remains the only home video release to date.

Plot
Gale (Jemma Redgrave) is trapped in a loveless marriage to a powerful and wealthy Ben (Tim Woodward). Tired of living under the thumb, she conspires with her lover Adam (Gary Mavers), with whom she has been having an affair, to plot the perfect murder. There is only one problem: Adam is a police officer. As he tries to talk Gale out of the ludicrous plan, he finds himself being drawn into her world of murder and betrayal. Convinced that Ben is a bully and a cheat, Adam and Gale work together to plot the murder. The deed is carried out, and to his relief, Adam's team are called to investigate. Adam is delighted when it appears that the team are nowhere close to identifying the killer – until his colleague Vanessa (Emma Cunniffe) makes a major breakthrough and finds a major discrepancy in Gale's version of events. And with a potential new witness coming forward, Gale's number appears to be up. But, as her fate appears to be sealed, Adam discovers she could possibly be involved in another murder.

Cast
 Gary Mavers as DS Adam Ross
 Jemma Redgrave as Gale Francombe
 Tim Woodward as Ben Francombe
 Sheila Ballantine as Morna
 Julie Bramall	as Abbey
 Flaminia Cinque as Carla
 Claire Cox as Jenny
 Emma Cunniffe as Vanessa
 Sean McGinley as Shelley
 Kevin McMonagle as Pascoe
 Ash Tandon as Lawrence Farren

References

External links

2000 films
2000 television films
2000 crime drama films
British television films
Carlton Television
ITV television dramas
Television series by ITV Studios
Films scored by Colin Towns
2000s English-language films
Films shot in England